Blacktown is a 2005 Australian film produced, written, and directed by Kriv Stenders. It stars Nikki Owen, Tony Ryan, and Clayton Jacobson. The movie was named for the Sydney suburb of Blacktown where it was set and shot. The film, which Stenders financed himself for $50,000, won Most Popular Feature at the Sidebar Program at the 2006 Sydney Film Festival.

Premise
Nikki (Niki Owen) is a secretary who is struggling in a relationship with a married man. When she meets Tony (Tony Ryan), 'a black fella on a white bus', and despite their obvious differences, Nikki learns that there is room for romance in the desperate western suburbs struggle that is life in Blacktown.

References

External links
Review of film at Cinephilia

2005 films
Australian romantic drama films
Films directed by Kriv Stenders
2000s English-language films
2000s Australian films